This is a list of ambassadors to Luxembourg. Note that some ambassadors are responsible for more than one country while others are directly accredited to Luxembourg.

Current ambassadors to Luxembourg

See also
 Foreign relations of Luxembourg
 List of diplomatic missions of Luxembourg
 List of diplomatic missions in Luxembourg

References
  Missions diplomatiques étrangères accréditées au Luxembourg

Ambassadors to Luxembourg
 
Luxembourg